Anabel Medina Garrigues and Caroline Wozniacki were the defending champion, but Wozniacki chose not to participate this year. Medina Garrigues partnered with Virginia Ruano Pascual, but they lost in the second round against Anastasia Pavlyuchenkova and Yanina Wickmayer.Hsieh Su-Wei and Peng Shuai won in the final 6–3, 6–1 against Alla Kudryavtseva and Ekaterina Makarova.

Seeds
The top four seeds receive a bye into the second round.

Draw

Finals

Top half

Bottom half

External links
 Main Draw

China Open - Women's Doubles
2009 China Open (tennis)